Wyoming Highway 220 (WYO 220) is the principal highway connecting the city of Casper to US 287/WYO 789. WYO 220 lies in northwestern Carbon and southern Natrona counties and along the famous Oregon Trail.

Route description

Wyoming Highway 220 begins its western end in Carbon County at US 287/WYO 789 at Muddy Gap Junction and from there heads northeast toward Casper. Nearing 20 miles, Highway 220 leaves Carbon County and enters Natrona County as it nears the north side of the Pathfinder Reservoir and the Pathfinder National Wildlife Refuge. WYO 220 passes north of the reservoir, now traveling more easterly as it comes upon the census-designated place (CDP) of Alcova, the center of population of Wyoming. Also to the south lies Alcova Lake. Past Alcova, WYO 220 turns back northeast and begins to parallel the North Platte River and continue until it reaches Casper. At 53.17 miles the northern terminus of Wyoming Highway 487 is intersected as 220 continues northeast. Just before entering the Casper city limits, the two-lane highway becomes a divided multi-lane highway with two lanes for each direction of traffic, and becomes known as CY Avenue. Wyoming Highway 258 (Wyoming Boulevard) is intersected at just over 69 miles. Past WYO 258, the multi-lane division continues until just before the intersection of CY Avenue and Poplar Street.  At this intersection, WYO 220 follows Poplar Street north. As WYO 220 heads north on Poplar Avenue, US 20 Business/US 26 Business (First Street) is intersected within a mile and three-quarters of a mile later, WYO 220 reaches its eastern end at Interstate 25 (exit 188B), which also carries US 20/US 26/US 87 as well.

The highway is maintained by WYDOT, except for portions of CY Avenue and Poplar Street in Casper, which are maintained locally.

History
Between 1926 and 1938, what is now WYO 220 was part of U.S. Route 87E (US 87E). In 1938, US 87E's portion in Wyoming was redesignated as WYO 220. Since then, there have been few routing changes except that it was connected to I-25 when the interstate was completed through Casper

Major intersections

See also

 List of state highways in Wyoming
 List of highways numbered 220

References

External links

aaroads.com - Wyoming Routes 200-299
WYO 220 - US 287/WYO 789 to WYO 487
WYO 220 - WYO 487 to WYO 258
WYO 220 - WYO 258 to US 20 BUS/US 26 BUS
WYO 220 - US 20 BUS/US 26 BUS to I-25/US 20/US 26/US 87

220
Transportation in Carbon County, Wyoming
Transportation in Natrona County, Wyoming
U.S. Route 87